Howard Sampson is a former defensive back in the National Football League. He played two seasons with the Green Bay Packers.

Civic Leadership 
Howard Sampson was appointed to the Goose Creek CISD Board of Trustees in August 2009. Sampson attended school in this district, graduating in 1974 from Ross S. Sterling High School, where he played football. Goose Creek Consolidated Independent School District. He is currently serving as a board member on the board of trustees. His current term ends in May 2025.
 
Sampson has been a resident of the district for many years and even grew up in the district, attending Harlem Elementary, and Highlands Junior School. He is a 1974 graduate of Sterling High School. After graduating from Sterling, Sampson attended the University of Arkansas, where he earned a bachelor's degree in sociology in 1978 and earned a master's degree in city planning from Texas Southern University in 1987. He also attended and earned a certification from the University of Houston's mediation school.

Sampson is currently an assistant superintendent in the Harris County Precinct 2 Road & Bridge Inspection Department, where he has worked since 1997.

See also
 Goose Creek Consolidated Independent School District

References

1956 births
Living people
People from Baytown, Texas
Green Bay Packers players
American football defensive backs
Arkansas Razorbacks football players
Sportspeople from Harris County, Texas
Players of American football from Texas